is an Italian-Japanese anime anthology series based on fairy tales and classic stories, produced by Toei Animation, Fuji Eight and Reteitalia in 1993.

Premise 
It consists of 26 episodes, each one adapting a popular fairy tale or a literature classic written by a famous author such as: the Brothers Grimm, Charles Perrault, Hans Christian Andersen, Carlo Collodi, Lewis Carroll, Alexandre Dumas, Howard Pyle, Jonathan Swift, Johanna Spyri, L. Frank Baum, E. T.  A. Hoffmann, James Halliwell-Phillipps, Antoine Galland and Jeanne-Marie Leprince de Beaumont. Most of the episodes follow quite closely the original source material, with some changes made to alter unhappy endings or to suit the half-hour episode run. Between 1975 and 1983 Toei had already produced a similar series: World Famous Fairy Tale Series. Some of these fairy tales had also been adapted by Toei into feature length movies (Arabian Nights: The Adventures of Sinbad, The World of Hans Christian Andersen, The Wonderful World of Puss 'n Boots, Hans Christian Andersen’s The Little Mermaid, Thumbelina and Aladdin and the Wonderful Lamp).

The series premiered in France in October 1994 in a collection of VHS, and it later aired in December on France 3 (Les Contes les plus célèbres). It aired in Italy on Italia 1 from 4 February 1995 (Le fiabe più belle), and in Japan on Fuji TV and other networks from 7 April to 29 September of the same year. 

A variety of different artists from other Toei's popular series worked on the episodes, such as Sailor Moon's director Junichi Sato and character designer Ikuko Itoh, or Space Pirate Captain Harlock, and Saint Seya's composer Seiji Yokoyama. 

The Italian Dub featured different incidental music composed by Enzo Draghi, and it served as a basis for the French, Spanish, Polish, Romanian and Greek dubs as well. The series was also popular in the Middle East, airing on Spacetoon.

Cast

Episodes

References

External links 
 Official website
 World Fairy Tale Series at Anime News Network's encyclopedia
 World Fairy Tale Series at MyAnimeList
 

Adventure anime and manga
Fantasy anime and manga
Romance anime and manga
Anime and manga based on fairy tales
Fuji TV original programming
Animation anthology series
1995 anime television series debuts
Toei Animation television